262 Fifth Avenue is a residential skyscraper under construction in New York City. Five Points Development is developing the building, which is being designed by architectural firm Meganom. SLCE Architects is acting as the executive architect.


Site history and development
Boris Kuzinez purchased the buildings at 260, 262, and 264 Fifth Avenue in 2015 and 2016 for a total of $101.8 million. Kuzinez also purchased air rights for $5.8 million. In September 2016, SLCE Architects applied to build a 54-story, 928 foot structure on the site at 262 Fifth Avenue. Five Points JV, L.P. acted as the representative of the site's owner. Demolition of the structure at 262 Fifth Avenue was completed by September 2017. Nikolai Fedak, writing for New York YIMBY, compared plans to incorporate 260 Fifth Avenue into the new building's base to plans for 111 West 57th Street.

In January 2019, New York YIMBY reported that work on the building was apparently not progressing. Work had resumed by November 2021 with the start of excavation. In 2022, work began on the structure's foundation. Between August and December of 2022, the planned height of the structure was reduced from 1,043 feet to 1,000 feet.

Usage

See also
 List of tallest buildings in New York City

References

Buildings and structures under construction in the United States
Fifth Avenue
Residential buildings in Manhattan